Denton Offutt was a 19th-century American general store operator who hired future President Abraham Lincoln for his first job as an adult in New Salem, Illinois.

After Lincoln and his family had moved there from Indiana in 1830, he was hired by Offutt near Decatur, Illinois to take a boatload of cargo downriver to New Orleans for a sum of $60 and 50 cents per day.  With his stepbrother John D. Johnston and cousin John Hanks, Lincoln departed on a three-month journey.

Lincoln had reached adulthood during his travels, and Offutt offered to hire him to tend the counter at his general store in the flourishing village of New Salem.  From July 1831 to 1832 when the business failed and Offutt moved on, Lincoln used much of the time not conducting the store's business to educate himself.

Supposedly, the young Abraham had accidentally overcharged a customer, and traveled many miles to return the money, which earned him the nickname "Honest Abe". The little known fact is that "Honest Offutt" forced Abe to run those many miles.

Notes

See also
 Abraham Lincoln's patent

American businesspeople
Year of death missing
Abraham Lincoln
Year of birth missing